A floor is the bottom surface of a room or vehicle. Floors vary from simple dirt in a cave to many layered surfaces made with modern technology. Floors may be stone, wood, bamboo, metal or any other material that can support the expected load.

The levels of a building are often referred to as floors, although a more proper term is storey.

Floors typically consist of a subfloor for support and a floor covering used to give a good walking surface. In modern buildings the subfloor often has electrical wiring, plumbing, and other services built in. As floors must meet many needs, some essential to safety, floors are built to strict building codes in some regions.

Special floor structures 

Where a special floor structure like a floating floor is laid upon another floor, both may be called subfloors.

Special floor structures are used for a number of purposes:

 Balcony, a platform projecting from a wall
 Floating floor, normally for noise or vibration reduction
 Glass floor, as in glass bottomed elevators
 Nightingale floor makes a noise when an intruder walks on it
 Raised floor, utilities underneath can be accessed easily
 Sprung floor, improves the performance and safety of athletes and dancers

Floor covering 

Floor covering is a term to generically describe any material applied over a floor structure to provide a walking surface. Flooring is the general term for a permanent or temporary covering of a floor, or for the work of installing such a floor covering. Both terms are used interchangeably but floor covering refers more to loose-laid materials.

Materials almost always classified as floor covering include carpet, area rugs, and resilient flooring such as linoleum or vinyl flooring. Materials commonly called flooring include wood flooring, laminated wood, ceramic tile, stone, terrazzo, and various seamless chemical floor coatings.

The choice of material for floor covering is affected by factors such as cost, endurance, noise insulation, comfort and cleaning effort, and sometimes concern about allergens. Some types of flooring must not be installed below grade (lower than ground level), and laminate or hardwood should be avoided where there may be moisture or condensation.

The subfloor may be finished in a way that makes it usable without any extra work. See: 
 Earthen floor adobe or clay floors
 Solid ground floor cement screed or granolithic

A number of special features may be used to ornament a floor or perform a useful service. Examples include floor medallions, which provide a decorative centerpiece of a floor design, or gratings used to drain water or to rub dirt off shoes.

Subfloor construction 
Floors may be built on beams or joists or use structures like prefabricated hollow core slabs. The subfloor builds on those and attaches by various means particular to the support structure, but the support and subfloor together always provides the strength of a floor one can sense underfoot. Nowadays, subfloors are generally made from at least two layers of moisture-resistant ("AC" grade, one side finished and sanded flat) plywood or composite sheeting, jointly also termed Underlayments on floor joists of 2x8, 2x10, or 2x12's (dimensional lumber) spaced generally on  centers, in the United States and Canada. Some flooring components used solely on concrete slabs consist of a dimpled rubberized or plastic layer much like bubble wrap that provide little tiny pillars for the  sheet material above. These are manufactured in  squares and the edges fit together like a mortise and tenon joint. Like a floor on joists not on concrete, a second sheeting underlayment layer is added with staggered joints to disperse forces that would open a joint under the stress of live loads like a person walking.

Three layers are common only in highest-quality construction. The two layers in high-quality construction will both be thick  sheets (as will the third when present), but they may have a combined thickness of only half that in cheaper construction  panel overlaid by  plywood subflooring. The structure under such a floor will frequently also have extra "bracing" and "blocking" joist-to-joist intended to spread the weight to have as little sagging on any joist as possible when there is a live load on the floor above.

In Europe and North America only a few rare floors have no separate floor covering on top, and those are normally because of a temporary condition pending sales or occupancy; in semi-custom new construction and some rental markets, such floors are provided for the new home buyer or renter to select their preferred floor coverings, usually a wall-to-wall carpet or one-piece vinyl floor covering. Wood clad (hardwood) and tile covered finished floors generally require a stiffer, higher-quality subfloor, especially for the later class. Since the wall base and flooring interact forming a joint, such later added semi-custom floors will generally not be hardwood, for that joint construction would be in the wrong order unless the wall base trim was also delayed pending the choosing.

The subfloor may also provide underfloor heating and if floor radiant heating is not used, will certainly suffer puncture openings to be put through for forced air ducts for both heating and air conditioning, or pipe holes for forced hot water or steam heating transport piping conveying the heat from furnace to the local room's heat exchangers (radiators).

Some subfloors are inset below the top surface level of surrounding flooring's joists and such subfloors and a normal height joist are joined to make a plywood box both molding and containing at least  of concrete (A mud floor" in builders' parlance). Alternatively, only a slightly inset floor topped by a fibrous mesh and concrete building composite floor cladding is used for smaller high quality tile floors; these "concrete" subfloors have a good thermal match with ceramic tiles and so are popular with builders constructing kitchen, laundry and especially both common and high end bathrooms and any other room where large expanses of well supported ceramic tile will be used as a finished floor. Floors using small ( and smaller) ceramic tiles generally use only an additional  layer of plywood (if that) and substitute adhesive and substrate materials making do with both a flexible joints and semi-flexible mounting compounds and so are designed to withstand the greater flexing which large tiles cannot tolerate without breaking.

Ground floor construction 

A ground-level floor can be an earthen floor made of soil, or be solid ground floors made of concrete slab.

Ground level slab floors are uncommon in northern latitudes where freezing provides significant structural problems, except in heated interior spaces such as basements or for outdoor unheated structures such as a gazebo or shed where unitary temperatures are not creating pockets of troublesome meltwaters. Ground-level slab floors are prepared for pouring by grading the site, which usually also involves removing topsoil and other organic materials well away from the slab site. Once the site has reached a suitable firm inorganic base material that is graded further so that it is flat and level, and then topped by spreading a layer-cake of force dispersing sand and gravel. Deeper channels may be dug, especially the slab ends and across the slab width at regular intervals in which a continuous run of rebar is bent and wired to sit at two heights within forming a sub-slab "concrete girder". Above the targeted bottom height (coplanar with the compacted sand and gravel topping) a separate grid of rebar or welded wire mesh is usually added to reinforce the concrete, and will be tied to the under slab "girder" rebar at intervals. The under slab cast girders are used especially if it the slab be used structurally, i.e., to support part of the building.

Upper floor construction 

Heavy floors, such as those made of stone, require more closely spaced joists. If the span between load-bearing walls is too long for joists to safely support, then a heavy crossbeam (thick or laminated wood, or a metal I-beam or H-beam) may be used. A "subfloor" of plywood or waferboard is then laid over the joists.

Utilities 

In modern buildings, there are numerous services provided via ducts or wires underneath the floor or above the ceiling. The floor of one level typically also holds the ceiling of the level below (if any).

Services provided by subfloors include:

 Air conditioning
 Communication fibers
 Electrical wiring
 Fire protection
 Thermal insulation
 Plumbing
 Sewerage
 Soundproofing
 Underfloor heating

In floors supported by joists, utilities are run through the floor by drilling small holes through the joists to serve as conduits.  Where the floor is over the basement or crawlspace, utilities may instead be run under the joists, making the installation less expensive. Also, ducts for air conditioning (central heating and cooling) are large and cannot cross through joists or beams; thus, ducts are typically at or near the plenum, or come directly from underneath (or from an attic).

Pipes for plumbing, sewerage, underfloor heating, and other utilities may be laid directly in slab floors, typically via cellular floor raceways. However, later maintenance of these systems can be expensive, requiring the opening of concrete or other fixed structures. Electrically heated floors are available, and both kinds of systems can also be used in wood floors as well.

Problems with floors 
Wood floors, particularly older ones, will tend to 'squeak' in certain places. This is caused by the wood rubbing against other wood, usually at a joint of the subfloor. Firmly securing the pieces to each other with screws or nails may reduce this problem.

Floor vibration is a problem with floors. Wood floors tend to pass sound, particularly heavy footsteps and low bass frequencies. Floating floors can reduce this problem. Concrete floors are usually so massive they do not have this problem, but they are also much more expensive to construct and must meet more stringent building requirements due to their weight.

Floors with a chemical sealer, like stained concrete or epoxy finishes, usually have a slick finish presenting a potential slip and fall hazard, however there are anti skid additives and coatings which can help mitigate this and provide increased traction. Reliable, science-backed floor slip resistance testing can help floor owners and designers determine if their floor is too slippery, or allow them to choose an appropriate flooring for the intended purpose before installation.

The flooring may need protection sometimes. A gym floor cover can be used to reduce the need to satisfy incompatible requirements.

Floor cleaning 

Floor cleaning is a major occupation throughout the world and has been since ancient times. Cleaning is essential for hygiene, to prevent injuries due to slips, and to remove dirt. Floors are also treated to protect or beautify the surface. The correct method to clean one type of floor can often damage another, so it is important to use the correct treatment.

See also 

 Floor area
 Floor numbering
 Floor plan
 Self-cleaning floor
 Sensing floor
 Sidewalk
 Storey

References

External links

 
Building materials
Structural system
SS Linden Floors